Champions Gamemaster's Screen is a 1981 role-playing game supplement for Champions published by Hero Games.

Contents
Champions Gamemaster's Screen is a pair of stand-up gamemaster's screens screens that contain charts and tables for playing Champions.

Gamemaster's Screen for Champions is a GM's screen with charts and tables from the 1st-ed. rules.  Gamemaster's Screen is a GM's screen displaying 3rd-ed. Combat charts for quick reference; it includes a scenario ("Adventure #1"), The Island of Dr. Destroyer (previously sold separately).

Publication history
Gamemaster's Screen for Champions was designed by Steve Peterson and George MacDonald, and was published by Hero Games, in 1981 as two cardstock screens.  Gamemaster's Screen was published in 1985 as a cardstock screen with a 16-page bound-in pamphlet.

Reception
Aaron Allston reviewed Champions Gamemaster's Screen in The Space Gamer No. 51. Allston commented that "GMs who really want a good-looking cardstock screen should pick this up; misers (like me) will improvise."

References

Champions (role-playing game) supplements
Gamemaster's screens
Role-playing game supplements introduced in 1981